Victoria is a town in Saint Mark Parish, Grenada.

Geography 
Along the west coast of the island nation of Grenada lies the fishing village of Victoria.

References

Populated places in Grenada